Indre og Østre Finnmark District Court ( or ) is a district court located in Finnmark, Norway. This court is based at two different courthouses which are located in Tana Bru and Vadsø. The court serves the central and eastern parts of Finnmark which includes 11 municipalities: Berlevåg, Båtsfjord, Gamvik, Karasjok, Kautokeino, Lebesby, Nesseby, Sør-Varanger, Tana, Vadsø, and Vardø. The court is subordinate to the Hålogaland Court of Appeal.

The court is led by a chief judge and several other judges. The court is a court of first instance. Its judicial duties are mainly to settle criminal cases and to resolve civil litigation as well as bankruptcy. The administration and registration tasks of the court include death registration, issuing certain certificates, performing duties of a notary public, and officiating civil wedding ceremonies. Cases from this court are heard by a combination of professional judges and lay judges.

History
This court was established on 26 May 2021 after the old Indre Finnmark District Court and Øst-Finnmark District Court were merged into one court. The new district court system continues to use the courthouses from the predecessor courts.

References

District courts of Norway
2021 establishments in Norway
Organisations based in Vadsø
Organisations based in Tana Bru